Bag of the Collector is a 1979 Soviet crime drama directed by Augusto Baltrušaitis.

Plot
The investigation group of the prosecutor's office of the USSR is charged with the case of the collectors who were burned in the car which transported the proceeds of an airport.

It is found out that the money in the car did not burn, but was taken out before the fire. There are also traces of a homemade pyrotechnic device found. In addition, as the examination shows, nerve gas was used against the people traveling in the car.

The group proceeds to investigate the crime ...

Cast
Georgi Burkov - Alexander Alexandrovich Sanin
Donatas Banionis - Alexei Petrovich Tulyakov (voiced by Igor Efimov)
Elena Naumkina - Margarita Ivanovna Ustinova
Vytautas Tomkus - Yury Petrovich Borisov
Natalya Fateyeva - Ksenia Nikolaevna Kovaleva
Anatoly Solonitsyn - Ivan Timofeevich
Igor Erelt - Igor Andreevich Peshekhonov
Mikhail Svetin- Chebotaryov
Gia Kobakhidze - Norakidze
M. Sizov - expert

References

External links

Soviet crime drama films
1979 crime drama films
1979 films
1970s Russian-language films